Ville Kurki (24 March 1968 – 12 July 2022) was a Finnish sailor. He competed in the Star event at the 1996 Summer Olympics.

References

External links
 

1968 births
2022 deaths
Finnish male sailors (sport)
Olympic sailors of Finland
Sailors at the 1996 Summer Olympics – Star
People from Kerava
Sportspeople from Uusimaa